Maitri  also known as Friendship Research Centre, is India's second permanent research station in Antarctica as part of the Indian Antarctic Programme. The name was suggested by then-Prime Minister Indira Gandhi. Work on the station was first started by the Indian Expedition which landed there in the end December 1984, with a team led by Dr. B. B. Bhattacharya. Squadron Leader D. P. Joshi, the surgeon of the team, was the first camp commander of the tentage at camp Maitri. The first huts were started by the IV Antarctica Expedition and completed in 1989, shortly before the first station Dakshin Gangotri was buried in ice and abandoned in 1990–91. Maitri is situated in the rocky mountainous region called Schirmacher Oasis.

Facilities

The station has modern facilities to research in various disciplines, such as biology, earth sciences, glaciology, atmospheric sciences, meteorology, cold region engineering, communication, human physiology, and medicine. It can accommodate 25 people for winter. Freshwater is provided through a freshwater lake named Lake Priyadarshini, in front of Maitri.

Airfield

See also
 Indian Antarctic Program
 Bharati (research station) 
 Dakshin Gangotri First Indian station 1983, converted to support base
 Defence Research and Development Organisation 
 Defence Institute of High Altitude Research
 Indian Astronomical Observatory
 Jantar Mantar, Jaipur
 National Centre for Polar and Ocean Research
 Siachen Base Camp (India)
 List of Antarctic research stations
 List of Antarctic field camps
 List of highest astronomical observatories

References

External links
 National Centre for Antarctic & Ocean Research (NCAOR) of the Ministry of Earth Sciences of Government of India
 Amateur Radio Operator Selected for Antarctica Expedition

Outposts of Antarctica
Indian Antarctic Programme
Research in India
1989 establishments in Antarctica